Baby John Memorial Government College, is a general degree college located in Chavara, Kollam district, Kerala. It was established in the year 1981. This college is affiliated with Kerala University. This college offers different courses in arts, commerce and science.

Departments

Science

Physics
Chemistry
Mathematics
Statistics
Botany
Zoology

Arts and Commerce

Malayalam
English
Hindi
Arbic
History
Political Science
Economics
Commerce

Accreditation
The college is recognized by the University Grants Commission (UGC).

References

External links
https://web.archive.org/web/20180817195602/http://www.bjmgovtcollege.in/

Universities and colleges in Kollam district
Educational institutions established in 1981
1981 establishments in Kerala
Arts and Science colleges in Kerala
Colleges affiliated to the University of Kerala